Retallack is a village in Cornwall, England. The Cornish surname Retallack comes from the three places named Retallack in Cornwall ( 

Retallack may also refer to:
 Retallack, British Columbia, Canada, a deserted mining town
 Joan Retallack (born 1941), American poet and scholar
 John Retallack (born 1950), British playwright and director
 Gregory Retallack (born 1951), Australian paleontologist and geologist, authority on fossil soils
 Retallack Resort and Spa, a holiday resort in Cornwall, situated near the site of Retallack village, close to St Columb Major

See also
 Retallick, a surname
 , a ship in Britain's Royal Navy